The 2018–19 Ukrainian Premier League Reserves and Under 19 season are competitions between the reserves of Ukrainian Premier League Clubs and the Under 19s.

Teams

Under 21 competition

Standings

Top scorers

Under 19 competition

Top scorers

See also
 2018–19 Ukrainian Premier League

References

Reserves
Ukrainian Premier Reserve League seasons